Cardiff is a small town in the Lake Macquarie LGA of New South Wales, Australia.

Cardiff is home to two government primary schools, a Catholic primary school and a government high school. It has its own commercial centre with a post office, pub (hotel), real estate agencies, take-away shops, a record store, two opportunity stores, numerous hairdressers and two supermarkets.

History
The Aboriginal people, in this area, the Awabakal, were the first people of this land.

Other selections were taken up by individual settlers from 1862 to the east of the Weller grant. The locality became known as Winding Creek after the stream which wound its way from south-east to north-west across the central valley of the area.

In the latter part of the 19th century two factors attracted people to the Winding Creek area. One was coal mining, with the Lymington (1882) and South Wallsend (1884, later renamed Cardiff) collieries both starting production in the vicinity of the current Cardiff South. The other was the decision to construct the Sydney to Newcastle railway, which led to a navvies camp being established at Winding Creek in 1883, and work continuing through most of the rest of the decade. The line originally ran close to current Myall Rd, however the gradient from Cardiff up to Tickhole Tunnel proved too steep for the trains of the period, and the line was relocated to the present position a few years after it was opened.

For a short period in the 1880s Lymington became the popular name for the whole Cardiff area, supplanting Winding Creek, however it fell foul of the postal authorities, because of its similarity to another, established locality name. There were a number of Welsh settlers living in the area, and on the suggestion of one of them, James Edwards, the name Cardiff was chosen after the capital of Wales. It was officially adopted in 1889.

Education
The suburb is home to two government primary schools, Cardiff Public School and Cardiff North Public School; a government secondary school, Cardiff High School; and a Catholic primary school, St. Kevin's Primary School.

Cardiff High School, opened in late 1962, is a public secondary school located at 30 Boronia Street in Cardiff serving Cardiff, Cardiff South, Garden Suburb, Hillsborough, and Macquarie Hills areas.  It celebrated its 50th birthday in 2013.

Population statistics
According to the 2016 census, there were 5,830 people in Cardiff and surrounding areas including Garden Suburb, Cardiff Heights, Cardiff South, Cardiff North and Hillborough.
 Aboriginal and Torres Strait Islander people made up 4.0% of the population. 
 86.0% of people were born in Australia. The next most common country of birth was England at 1.7%.   
 90.8% of people spoke only English at home. 
 The most common responses for religion were No Religion 32.5%, Catholic 20.7% and Anglican 20.1%.

Shopping
Cardiff has a small shopping centre, as well as numerous small specialty stores. There are two supermarkets: an Aldi store, as well as a Woolworths supermarket.

The Woolworths shopping centre features a liquor store, newsagency, bakery, sushi cafe, hairdresser, travel agency, as well as a Woolworths supermarket.

Sporting clubs
Cardiff has sporting clubs for the following sports: 
 Cricket (Warners Bay-Cardiff Junior Cricket Club, Cardiff-Boolaroo District Cricket Club, Ulinga Cricket Club)
 Rugby League (Cardiff Cougars, Cardiff Cobras)
 Football (soccer) (Cardiff JSFC)
 Lawn Bowls (Cardiff Bowling Club)
 Netball (Cardiff Netball Club)
 Australian rules football (Cardiff Hawks)

Car sales
The suburb is home to a large number of car dealerships, including dealership for Ford, Honda, Hyundai, Kia Motors, Mitsubishi Motors, Nissan, Toyota, Toyota, and Volkswagen. The suburb is also home to a number of used car dealerships.

Industrial Estate
Cardiff is a major employment area thanks to the Cardiff Industrial Estate, which is the highest employing area in the Hunter region.

Around half of that industrial estate is accessible only via one section of Munibung Road, a two-lane road between two T-intersections (Torrens Avenue and Mitchell Road) which experience frequent crashes.  The intersection of Munibung Road with Macquarie Road and Myall Road is the main access point for the entire industrial estate and suffers from some of the most severe congestion in the Hunter Region.

A proposal exists for the extension of Pennant Street over the railway line to a roundabout connecting to Main Road near Glendale Drive and to the end of Stockland Drive inside the Stockland Glendale shopping centre. The proposal also includes the construction of a new railway station for access to the industrial estate and the Glendale shopping centre. The proposal is ready to proceed but has been awaiting state government funding for several years.

In 2021 Munibung Road was extended through the redeveloped former Pasminco Sulphide site, connecting through the new light industrial and residential development to T C Frith Avenue in Boolaroo.

Railway

The main northern railway line passes through Cardiff to the north of the industrial estate and commercial centre. Cardiff railway station is located on Main Road up a steep hill from the commercial centre.

The railway station has a single island platform, which is located between the two tracks.

Two carparks are provided on the southern side of the railway station. A small carpark is located directly alongside the southbound track, while a larger carpark is located down another steep staircase.

References

External links
 History of Cardiff (Lake Macquarie City Library)

Suburbs of Lake Macquarie